Suman Chakraborty is Professor at the Indian Institute of Technology Kharagpur and Sir J. C. Bose National Fellow (bestowed by the Ministry of Science and Technology, Government of India),. He has served as the Dean, Research and Development, Associate Dean and the Head of the School of Medical Science and Technology of the Institute. He has also been Institute/ National Academy of Engineering Chair Professor. He joined the Institute in 2002 as Assistant Professor and has been a Full Professor since 2008.

Chakraborty completed his undergraduate studies in Mechanical Engineering from Jadavpur University in 1996. After a brief industrial experience, he joined the Masters of Engineering (ME) programme Indian Institute of Science (IISc), on securing the 1st Rank in the Nationally conducted Graduate Aptitude Test for Engineering (GATE-1997). In his ME program, he emerged as the faculty topper and received gold medal and Senate Commendation for outstanding performance. Thereafter, he joined Jadavpur University as a lecturer. In 2000, he joined the IISc for his doctoral research. He received his Ph.D. in 2002, and was bestowed with the Institute level best-thesis award as well as “Best International CFD Thesis Award”, for his work on solid-liquid phase transition during thermal processing of materials.

Chakraborty's research interest lies in fundamentals of micro/nano scale fluid dynamics, miniaturization, and its applications focused towards sustainable technology goals for promoting good health and well-being of the underserved. Some notable fundamental discoveries emerging from his research endeavours include: surface roughness-aided slippery flow, massively-amplified ionic-pumping in highly confined water, sticky-flow of water on nano-engineered hydrophobic interfaces, programmable manoeuvring of tiny droplets along arbitrary preferential directions, generating controlled microbubbles on portable spinning-disc, reversing thermally-driven spontaneous migration of nano-droplets – defying common scientific intuitions in all cases. Extending his findings on confined-liquids to soft biological matter, he came up with new insights on puzzling anti-biotic resistance in life-threatening infectious diseases. He also introduced niche low-cost bio-inspired fabrication and analytical tools to unveil several hitherto-unresolved mysteries of blood flow in human-body microvasculature, including the collective-dynamics of red blood cells. He innovated a biomimetic tumour-on-a-chip technology for unleashing the mechanisms of cancer progression, aiding highly-effective drug screening, and throwing light on the efficacy of suggestive therapies.

Chakraborty is the inventor of ‘Paper and Pencil Microfluidics’ technology - a new class of electrically manipulative miniaturized devices that does not require any sophisticated fabrication facility. This emerged as a backbone of manufacturing niche low-cost medical diagnostic devices, as well as facilitating water desalination and energy-harvesting systems on simple paper-strips. By harnessing such spontaneous ion-water interaction in an interlaced fibrous cellulose network, he further demonstrated electrical power generation using wet textiles, drawing analogies with water transpiration in living plants.

Chakraborty is also known for developing disruptive medical diagnostic technologies for the underserved. He was the first to put-forward a fundamental design basis for all the present-day point-of-care diagnostic tests that are premised on micro-capillary flow. By analysing the pattern formation in a blood drop on a pre-wetted paper-strip, he put forward a new approach of reagent-free screening of anaemic patients in resource-limited settings. He developed a portable spinning disc to perform a Complete-Blood-Count test with virtually no-resource. He also invented a hand-held blood-perfusion imaging device for early screening of oral pre-cancer and cancer outside structured clinics. With success in phase-1 clinical trial, this technology is being adapted for risk-assessment in cervical cancer patients as well. His innovation of a new Piecewise Isothermal Nucleic Acid test (COVIRAP) has emerged as the first of its kind highly-accurate molecular-diagnostic technology for infectious disease detection, albeit with the cost and simplicity of a rapid test. This generic platform technology, applicable for several diseases beyond COVID-19, has been certified by regulatory authorities and commercialized for global dissemination.

Chakraborty further demonstrated a pathway of translating high-end lab-innovation to under-developed locations belonging to the bottom of the pyramid. His invented devices have come into practical use in several rural healthcare centres after rigorous clinical-validation, with proven efficacy in extreme dirt, dust, humidity and rugged conditions where many of the high-end technologies are more likely to fail. This has made a paradigm shift in rural healthcare, bringing deep-science research to the green field for catering the needs of the underserved.

Beyond the ambit of technology development, Chakraborty leads a National-level Common Research and Technology Development Hub (CRTDH) on affordable healthcare, funded by the Department of Scientific and Industrial Research, Government of India. One key focus of the Hub is supporting the advancement of precision manufacturing of medical devices to minimize import-dependence and spread the technology availability to the last-mile. This hub is active in productizing and commercializing healthcare technologies innovated by him - solving healthcare-challenges for the community, fostering manufacturing growth, creating rural jobs, and introducing advanced technologies into the ambit of public health. This has built up a technologically empowered social ecosystem in the process, providing rural women with the essential skill-set of delivering primary healthcare-support to the last-mile, rejuvenating sustainable rural livelihood via enterprise formation and self-employment creation for the unemployed.

Chakraborty has published nearly 500 articles in reputed international journals (including high-impact interdisciplinary journals such as Advanced Materials, Proceedings of the National Academy of Sciences - USA, Physical Review Letters, Nano Letters, ACS Nano and large numbers of articles in prestigious topical Journals such as Lab-on-a-Chip, Physical Review, Physics of Fluids and Journal of Fluid Mechanics). More than 40 Ph.D. students have graduated under his supervision. He has around 25 numbers of patented technologies, several of which have been transferred to Companies and commercialized, as a reflection of high-impact translational outreach. These translated and commercialized technologies include premium innovations on nucleic acid based point-of-care rapid molecular diagnostic technology (COVIRAP), hand-held oral cancer screening device, paper- and compact-disc based blood test kits, rapid screening platform for antibiotic resistance, among several others.

Beyond his fundamental and translational research, Chakraborty has authored original fundamental texts and monographs in classical as well as emerging areas of scientific and technological pursuit. He developed several Internationally acclaimed video courses, under the National Programme on Technology Enhanced Learning (NPTEL). He also established a research-inspired teaching lab of microfluidics, the first of this kind where innovated frugal open-source bench-top experimental rigs have subsequently been advanced to develop industrial products.

Chakraborty has been awarded the Shanti Swarup Bhatnagar Prize; the highest Scientific Award from the Government. He has been elected as Fellows of American Physical Society, Royal Society of Chemistry, American Society of Mechanical Engineers, and all the National Academies of Science and Engineering; recipient of the Infosys Prize in the category of Engineering and Computer Science, G. D Birla Award for Scientific Research, National Academy of Sciences– Reliance Industries Platinum Jubilee Award for Application Oriented Research, Rajib Goyal Prize for Young Scientists, IIT Roorkee Research Awards, Indo-US Research Fellowship, Scopus Young Scientist Award, Young Scientist/ Young Engineer Awards from various National Academies of Science and Engineering, and Outstanding Teacher Award from the National Academy of Engineering. He has been listed among 75 Scientists of India Under 50 years age as recognized by the Department of Science and Technology, and he has also been listed among top-ranked global scientists in fluids and plasma as per an archival research survey from the Stanford University. He has also been a Humboldt Fellow.

Chakraborty has received high-value research grants from Government and premiere International funding agencies (British Council, Royal Academy of Engineering-UK, Indo-US Science and Technology Forum, NSF- USA, JSPS-Japan). He has also been a consultant to reputed Industries such as General Motors, Delphi, INTEL, SHELL, Tata Steel, ITC, ANSYS. His own start-up envisions novel diagnostic technologies towards fostering healthy life with no distinction between the haves and have-nots.

References

Academic staff of IIT Kharagpur
Engineers from West Bengal
Fellows of the American Physical Society